Althea Hester Warren (December 18, 1886December 19, 1958) was the director of the Los Angeles (California) Public Library from 1933 to 1947 and president of the American Library Association in 1943-1944. She was inducted into the California Library Association's Library Hall of Fame in 2013.

Biography and career

Warren was born on December 18, 1886 in Waukegan, Illinois, to Lansing Warren and Emma Blodgett. She attended the University of Chicago from 1904 to 1908. After traveling abroad in Europe, Warren started library school at the University of Wisconsin, graduating in 1911.  She was a branch manager in a "poor neighborhood" in the Chicago Public Library system, and she also managed a branch in the Sears, Roebuck store in that city, which served the store's employees. In 1914 she relocated with her family to San Diego, California, and during World War I she helped furnish books to soldiers at Camp Kearny, California, outside of San Diego. She worked in the San Diego Public Library system and was the head librarian there from 1916 to 1926. She moved to the Los Angeles Public Library in the latter year, having been chosen to oversee all the system's branch libraries. In 1933 she became LAPL head librarian, one of six women overseeing large public libraries in the United States at that time.

In November 1941, Warren, who was considered "#1 in the field of Women Librarians," took a leave from her Los Angeles job to become director of the ALA's National Defense Book Campaign, which sought to collect and organize distribution of books to American servicemen. The campaign, headquartered in New York City, eventually became known among her closest friends as "Warren's child." Warren was California Library Association president in 1921 and American Library Association (ALA) president in 1943-1944. She worked on the national level to increase federal aid to  libraries and to end discrimination faced by African American librarians at ALA conference hotels.

Warren retired in 1947 and then taught in library science programs in Wisconsin and Michigan and at the University of Southern California.

Personal life
Warren was gay. She and Gladys English, the Los Angeles Public Library's head of the Children's Department, were in love, (Orlean, The Library Book, pg. 197), living and traveling together for years. After English died, Warren created the American Library Association's Gladys English Memorial Collection, also called the Gladys English Collection.

References

External links

 Althea B. Warren Papers, 1942-1945, The American Library Association Archives

1886 births
1958 deaths
People from Waukegan, Illinois
University of Chicago alumni
University of Wisconsin–Madison School of Library and Information Studies alumni
Presidents of the American Library Association
American librarians
American women librarians
University of Southern California faculty
LGBT people from Illinois
American women academics